Anna "Peetzy" Merveldt-Steffens (born 20 September 1962 in Maple Ridge, British Columbia, Canada) is an Irish dressage rider competing at the Olympic level.
She competed at the 2012 Summer Olympics in the Individual dressage.

References

External links
 
 BBC Profile
 RTE Profile

1962 births
Living people
Irish female equestrians
Irish dressage riders
Olympic equestrians of Ireland
Equestrians at the 1992 Summer Olympics
Equestrians at the 2012 Summer Olympics